Dmitry Tursunov was the defending champion but decided not to participate.
Dustin Brown won the title, defeating Jan Mertl 7–6(7–1), 6–4 in the final.

Seeds

Draw

Finals

Top half

Bottom half

References
 Main Draw
 Qualifying Draw

Aegon GB Pro-Series Bath - Singles
2012 Men's Singles